The London Junior Football Championship is an annual Gaelic football competition contested by lower-tier London GAA clubs.

Wandsworth Gaels are the title holders (2022) defeating Tara in the Final. Conor Gilsenan, the former professional rugby player and star of The Apprentice on the BBC, played for the winning team in that game.

Finals listed by year

Wins listed by club

 Thomas McCurtains (3): 1966, 1980, 2017

 St Kiernan's (1): 1997

 Wandsworth Gaels (1): 2022

Format
Six clubs contest the competition.

 Brothers & Shalloe Pearse
 Cuchullains
 Dulwich Harps
 Garyowen
 Robert Emmetts
 St Anthony's

The winning team is promoted to the Intermediate Football Championship. In 2009, St Joseph's won so were promoted and replaced by Cuchullains who were relegated from the intermediate championship in 2009.

References

Junior Football Championship